WNPH (90.7 FM) is a non-commercial educational radio station licensed to Portsmouth, Rhode Island, United States, serving the Aquidneck Island area. The station is owned by The Public's Radio (TPR), the statewide NPR member station for Rhode Island, through licensee Rhode Island Public Radio.

TPR acquired the license in 2021 from Portsmouth Abbey School, a Benedictine institution, which had established it as a classical music station under the WJHD call letters in 1972. After nearly 50 years, the station was taken off the air in 2021 and the license sold. 

It is currently operating at low power under Special Temporary Authority from the FCC as TPR seeks to relocate to a new transmitter site off the Portsmouth Abbey School campus.

History
WJHD—named for John Hugh Diman, the founder of the Portsmouth Abbey School—first went into service in early 1972, using only a 10-watt RCA BTE-10C exciter and transmitter, two AR turntables, and a Shure mixer. Father Geoffrey Chase served as the station trustee during the 1970s, 1980s and 1990s. In 1981, the station was approved to increase its effective radiated power to 360 watts. During most of those years, the station was operational only nights and weekends, playing classical music.

In 1999, Father Edmund assumed responsibility for managing the staff and setting the operating hours. Debuting "The Blue Monk," Edmund's show played requests for faculty, parents, and members of the Rhode Island State Police who were listening while on patrol.

Portsmouth Abbey School opted to remove terrestrial broadcasting from its curriculum in 2021. It surrendered WJHD's license to the Federal Communications Commission on August 16, 2021; it was cancelled the same day. Later, in early September 2021, Portsmouth Abbey School rescinded its request, and the license was restored. The Public's Radio then purchased WJHD for $7,500 effective November 23, 2021. An application is pending to relocate the transmitter site from the school and to new facilities in South Kingstown, Rhode Island, increasing coverage in the southern portion of the state; the WJHD call sign was changed to WNPK on January 4, 2022.

On December 8, 2022, the station's call sign was changed again, this time to WNPH.

Notable WJHD alumni
Tom Winter, reporter for NBC News

References

External links

NPH
High school radio stations in the United States
Portsmouth, Rhode Island
Radio stations established in 1972
1972 establishments in Rhode Island